George Stearns may refer to:

 George Luther Stearns (1809–1867), American industrialist and merchant
 George M. Stearns (1831–1894), American attorney
 George Stearns (politician) (1901–1979), Progressive Conservative party member of the Canadian House of Commons
 George N. Stearns (1812–1882), tool designer and founder of the George N. Stearns Company